Reedsport Community Charter School is a public school in Reedsport, Oregon, United States. It serves middle- and high school-aged students.

History
The school was formerly named the Reedsport Junior/Senior High School, but became a public charter school in February 2010. The school was remodeled just prior to the renaming.

Academics
In 2017 the school offers English, social studies, REAP, credit recovery, shop, government, British lit, culinary, Spanish, health.

Athletics
The Reedsport Braves compete as part of the Oregon School Activities Association's Sunset Conference. The school offers cheer, cross country, volleyball, football, bowling, basketball, wrestling, track and field, baseball, and swimming.

References

Public middle schools in Oregon
High schools in Douglas County, Oregon
Public high schools in Oregon
Charter schools in Oregon